Mehran Alighadr (born 24 May 1989) is an Iranian professional futsal player. He is a Left Winger, and currently a member of Crop and the Iran national futsal team.

Honors

Country 
 FIFA Futsal World Cup
 Third place (1): 2016
 AFC Futsal Championship
 Champion (2): 2016 - 2018
 Grand Prix
 Runner-Up (2): 2014 - 2015

Club 
 Iranian Futsal Super League
 Champion (1): 2016–17 (Giti Pasand)

 Runner-Up (2): 2017–18 (Tasisat Daryaei) - 2018–19 (Giti Pasand)

Individual 

 phenomenon of iran league 2014
 The best Flank in Iran 2013
 The best player in Iran 2014

International goals

References 

 https://www.fifa.com/tournaments/mens/futsalworldcup/colombia2016/teams/1883211
 https://www.the-afc.com/en/more/content/tsg_report_afc_futsal_championship_uzbekistan_2016.html
 https://www.the-afc.com/en/more/content/tsg_report_afc_futsal_championship_chinese_taipei_2018.html
 https://www.instagram.com/p/CaRkcCAFOl6/
 https://www.ogol.com.br/edition.php?id_edicao=89118
 https://theotheriran.com/2015/11/08/iran-wins-silver-at-the-2015-futsal-grand-prix-in-brazil/
 https://www.playmakerstats.com/player.php?id=527701&edicao_id=87265
 https://www.gettyimages.com/photos/mehran-alighadr

External links
 Mehran Alighadr on Instagram
 Mehran Alighadr on YouTube

1989 births
Living people
People from Tabriz
Iranian men's futsal players
Futsal forwards
Sadra Shiraz FSC players
Melli Haffari FSC players
Giti Pasand FSC players
Tasisat Daryaei FSC players